Athies may refer to:
 Athies, Pas-de-Calais, a commune of France
 Athies, Somme, a commune of France
 Athies-sous-Laon, a commune of France

See also 
 Athie (disambiguation)